"Alors on danse" (French for "And so we dance") is a song by Belgian rapper Stromae. It was released in September 2009 in Belgium and in February 2010 in the rest of Europe. The song reached number one in Belgium, Albania, Austria, Bulgaria, the Czech Republic, Denmark, Finland, France, Germany, Greece, Italy, Luxembourg, the Netherlands, Poland, Romania, Russia, Slovakia, Switzerland and Turkey, and also reached number one on the European Hot 100 Singles.

The song also became a success in North America, as on 1 April 2010, "Alors on danse" was released in Canada, receiving airplay in Québec from NRJ Radio stations throughout the province, as well as CKOI-FM. Four months after the European release, almost one million copies worldwide were sold. The song spent 57 weeks on the German Singles Chart, making it the 40th song to spend one year or longer on that chart and the song with the 31st longest run. According to Francophonie Diffusion, "Alors on danse" was the most-played Francophone single worldwide of 2010. As of July 2014, it was the 83rd best-selling single of the 21st century in France, with 334,000 units sold.

Music video
Directed by Paul Van Haver & Jérome Guiot. At the beginning of the video, a man (played by Stromae) is sitting in his office. After a hard day's work, he apparently wants to visit his child, but as he arrives at his wife's house he is told to leave. He proceeds to walk down the street, and as he does this a homeless man steals his coat. He then enters a pub. At first he does not appear to enjoy himself, but as he becomes more inebriated he begins to sing on a small stage. After his performance he passes out, and is brought back by an unknown man, possibly his boss, from the pub to his office desk.

Covers and remixes
Pitbull covered the song under the name of "Guantanamera". American singer Lumidee released a cover version of the song along with rapper Chase Manhattan in March 2010. DJ Petro Panayoti released an Instrumental Remix at Byblos Club Africa in May 2010. Kanye West and Gilbere Forte released a remix together in August 2010.

In July 2018, a group of saxophonists (led by soloist Stéphane Mercier) performed an arrangement of the song at the Arcade du Cinquantenaire in Brussels for world leaders attending the NATO summit. In May 2019, Dubdogz's remix was officially released under Musical Freedom. The song is featured in The 100's sixth-season episode The Gospel of Josephine.

British DJs and producers Joel Corry and Jax Jones sampled the song in their 2021 track "Out Out" featuring English singer Charli XCX and American rapper Saweetie.

Track listings
 CD single
 "Alors on danse" (Radio Edit) – 3:29
 "Alors on danse" (Extended Mix) – 4:18

 CD single – Promo 1 
 "Alors on danse" – 3:28

 CD single – Promo 2 
 "Alors on danse" (Remix) – 2:51

 UK iTunes – EP
 "Alors on danse" (featuring Kanye West and Gilbere Forte) – 3:34
 "Alors on danse" (featuring Erik Hassle) – 3:28
 "Alors on danse" (Solo Remix) – 4:10
 "Alors on danse" (Solo Dub Remix) – 4:09
 "Alors on danse" (Mowgli Remix) – 6:25

 Digital Downloading
 "Alors on danse (Dubdogz Remix)" – 2:49

Charts

Certifications 

<--Post by François Delétraz a Figaro Magazine journalist-->

See also
Ultratop 40 number-one hits of 2009
Ultratop 40 number-one hits of 2010
Ultratop 50 number-one hits of 2010
List of number-one hits of 2010 (Austria)
List of number-one hits of 2010 (Denmark)
List of Dutch Top 40 number-one singles of 2010
List of European number-one hits of 2010
List of number-one hits of 2010 (France)
List of number-one hits of 2010 (Germany)
List of number-one hits of 2010 (Italy)
List of number-one singles of 2010 (Romania)
List of number-one hits of 2010 (Switzerland)
List of Polish Dance Chart number-one singles of 2010

References

External links
  

2009 singles
2010 singles
Stromae songs
Dutch Top 40 number-one singles
European Hot 100 Singles number-one singles
Number-one singles in Austria
Number-one singles in the Czech Republic
Number-one singles in Denmark
SNEP Top Singles number-one singles
Number-one singles in Germany
Number-one singles in Greece
Number-one singles in Italy
Number-one singles in Poland
Number-one singles in Romania
Number-one singles in Russia
Number-one singles in Slovakia
Number-one singles in Switzerland
Ultratop 50 Singles (Wallonia) number-one singles
Ultratop 50 Singles (Flanders) number-one singles
Songs written by Stromae
2009 songs